was a town located in Sakai District, Fukui Prefecture, Japan.

As of 2003, the town had an estimated population of 32,575 and a density of 303.42 persons per km². The total area was 107.36 km².

On March 20, 2006, Maruoka, along with the towns of Sakai (former), Harue and Mikuni (all from Sakai District), were merged to create the city of Sakai.

External links
 
 Sakai official website 

Dissolved municipalities of Fukui Prefecture
Sakai, Fukui